Faqir Zehi Khan Mohammad Bazar (also Romanized as Faqīr Zehī Khān Moḩammad Bāzār) is a village in Polan Rural District, Polan District, Chabahar County, Sistan and Baluchestan Province, Iran. At the 2006 census, its population was 82, in 12 families.

References 

Populated places in Chabahar County